Diskerud is a surname. Notable people with the surname include: 

Mix Diskerud (born 1990), Norwegian-born American soccer player
Trygve Diskerud (1903–1976), Norwegian harness racer